The 2022 Volta a Catalunya was a road cycling stage race that took place between 21 and 27 March 2022. The race took place primarily in the autonomous community of Catalonia in northeastern Spain, with the rest of the route in the department of Pyrénées-Orientales (known as Northern Catalonia) in southern France. It was the 101st edition of the Volta a Catalunya and the seventh race of the 2022 UCI World Tour.

Teams 
All 18 UCI WorldTeams and six UCI ProTeams made up the 24 teams that participated in the race. UCI ProTeam  was among the original invitees, but on 1 March 2022, the UCI revoked the licences of Russian and Belarusian teams due to the Russian invasion of Ukraine. In total, 165 riders started the race, of which 94 finished.

UCI WorldTeams

 
 
 
 
 
 
 
 
 
 
 
 
 
 
 
 
 
 

UCI ProTeams

Route 
After the previous nine editions of the race started in Calella, the first stage started and finished in Sant Feliu de Guíxols. L'Escala made its debut in the Volta as the start of stage 2. That same stage, the race crossed into France, finishing in Perpignan for the first time since the 1985 edition, before re-entering Spain during stage 3. Stages 3 and 4 both featured summit finishes at the ski resorts of La Molina and Boí Taüll, respectively, with the latter featuring for the first time since the 2002 edition. After a flat route for stage 5, from La Pobla de Segur to Vilanova i la Geltrú, the Costa Daurada hosted stage 6. The Volta concluded with the traditional last stage in and around Barcelona, finishing with six laps of a circuit around Montjuïc and Montjuïc Castle.

Stages

Stage 1 
21 March 2022 — Sant Feliu de Guíxols to Sant Feliu de Guíxols, 

After the stage, Sonny Colbrelli collapsed, fell unconscious, and required emergency medical treatment before being transferred to a hospital in a conscious and stable condition for further assessments.

Stage 2 
22 March 2022 — L'Escala to Perpignan (France),

Stage 3 
23 March 2022 — Perpignan (France) to La Molina,

Stage 4 
24 March 2022 — La Seu d'Urgell to Boí Taüll,

Stage 5 
25 March 2022 — La Pobla de Segur to Vilanova i la Geltrú,

Stage 6 
26 March 2022 — Costa Daurada (Salou) to Costa Daurada (Cambrils),

Stage 7 
27 March 2022 — Barcelona to Barcelona,

Classification leadership table 

 On stage 2, Quentin Pacher, who was fourth in the points classification, wore the blue-striped jersey, because first-placed Michael Matthews wore the green-striped jersey as the leader of the general classification, second-placed Jonas Iversby Hvideberg wore the red-striped jersey as the leader of the mountains classification, and third-placed Sonny Colbrelli withdrew before the stage.
 On stage 2, Andrea Bagioli, who was second in the young rider classification, wore the orange-striped jersey, because first-placed Jonas Iversby Hvideberg wore the red-striped jersey as the leader of the mountains classification.
 On stage 3, Michael Matthews, who was second in the points classification, wore the blue-striped jersey, because first-placed Jonas Iversby Hvideberg wore the green-striped jersey as the leader of the general classification. For the same reason, Joan Bou, who was second in the mountains classification, wore the red-striped jersey, and Mattias Skjelmose Jensen, who was second in the young rider classification, wore the orange-striped jersey.
 On stage 6, Juan Ayuso, who was third in the young rider classification, wore the orange-striped jersey, because first-placed João Almeida wore the green-striped jersey as the leader of the general classification and second-placed Sergio Higuita wore the Colombian national champion's jersey as the defending Colombian national road race champion.
 On stage 7, Mikel Bizkarra, who was second in the mountains classification, wore the red-striped jersey, because first-placed Sergio Higuita wore the green-striped jersey as the leader of the general classification. For the same reason, João Almeida, who was second in the young rider classification, wore the orange-striped jersey.

Final classification standings

General classification

Points classification

Mountains classification

Young rider classification

Team classification

References

Sources

External links 
 

2022
Volta a Catalunya
Volta a Catalunya
Volta a Catalunya
Volta a Catalunya